Parc Omega is a safari park in Notre-Dame-de-Bonsecours, Quebec, Canada (just north of Montebello). Along a  nature route are lakes, meadows, small valleys, forests, and rocky hills. It is home to many wildlife species including beaver, elk, raccoon, timber wolf, coyote, muskox, whitetail deer, mule deer, yellow bellied marmot, turtle, boar, red fox, Alpine ibex, caribou, black bear, wolverine, moose, wild turkey, cougar, canadian lynx, bobcat, eastern mole, american badger, american antelope, grizzly bear and bison. During the summer there are shows featuring birds of prey especially bald eagles. The site also has a restaurant with a panoramic view, a gift shop with Indigenous crafts, a woodstove-heated yurt, and a small outdoor stage for performances. The park is open daily, year round. 

The park is a drive-through experience, meaning visitors stay in their cars and drive at a slow speed through the park on a winding trail. They also offer three walking trails, playgrounds and picnic areas. The park runs two low-power FM radios stations that provide guidance and direction, in English and French. The complete experience takes about two to three hours.

Bags of carrots can be purchased at the visitors center at the start of the tour; these are fed to "safe" animals (elk, deer, etc.) throughout the tour, which come up to a visitor's car for treats.

External links

 Parc Omega official website

Tourist attractions in Outaouais
Zoos in Quebec
Protected areas of Outaouais
Articles needing infobox zoo